The Big Defreeze is an album by The Traveling Band.

References

2014 albums